Timothy Modise is a South African veteran journalist, broadcaster, public speaker and philanthropist. Boasting over thirty years in broadcast media and journalism, Modise has worked for various radio and TV stations of the SABC, M-Net, Primedia, BBC and Power FM across different formats from music, current affairs and talk shows. He was inducted in the Radio Hall of Fame in 2011.

Although grounded in the music formatted stations for five years of his early broadcasting career, the veteran journalist transitioned to the talk format when he introduced public education talk in 1988. He later introduced politically oriented talk, participating extensively in the coverage of the transition from 'apartheid' to the new 'constitutional democracy', reporting and commenting on the unbanning of the ANC and other liberation movements, the release of political prisoners, the uprisings, and subsequent negotiations that ushered in the South Africa of today. He provided voter education on his programmes, hosted the debates leading to the elections of 1994 which he also covered on both radio and TV. His highlight was being a panelist on the Mandela/De Klerk debate which was broadcast to a global audience of 800 million. He has interviewed all South African Presidents since 1990.

Tim Modise has also worked as a political analyst for AMB Securities & HSBC, a columnist for City Press newspaper and was appointed the founding chairman of Proudly South African by President Thabo Mbeki. He briefly worked as Chief Communications Officer of 2010 World Cup and later became CEO of Sizwe IT, a technology company.

He continues to cover South African public affairs and through his company FGPMedia, produces his own TV shows as well as his radio show on @touchhdonline. He has started a digital publication called Modise.net to promote entrepreneurship and the South African economy. He is involved in education and health sectors in his home community of Garankuwa as patron of the Tim Modise Primary School, member of Sefako Makgatho University and board member of George Mukhari Hospital. He has received numerous awards for community development, communication, broadcasting, reconciliation from IJR & Archbishop Tutu as well as for human rights from the Jaime Brunet Foundation, University of Navarro in Spain. He is a public speaker who has also given keynote speeches at graduation ceremonies of universities of Cape Town, Tshwane, UNISA and Wits. He has moderated and facilitated a variety of conferences and MC’d major events including Cape Town Jazz, Mandela 85 Birthday Ubuntu Awards & the Loerie Awards with Fran Drescher and Louis Gossett Jr. He obtained Advanced Management Diploma (AMP) from Henley Business School, Marketing Certificate UNISA, Financial Management Diploma from Damelin. Modise lives with his children in Kyalami, Johannesburg and enjoys music and reading biographies, world current affairs and developments.

Currently Tim Modise hosts his own current affairs shows on eNCA called ‘The Modise Network ‘ and another on Soweto TV called Tonight with Tim Modise. He also promotes entrepreneurship with research company Plus94 Research, collaborating on their support platform called BizNexus.

Highlights of Tim Modise's career:

 Introduced talk format at the SABC on Radio Metro in late 1980s.
 Worked with Editor of Sowetan newspaper Dr Aggrey Klaaste on the ‘Nation Building Project’.
 Interviewed numerous leaders in the lead up to 1994 elections; including Nelson Mandela, Thabo Mbeki, Mangosuthu Buthelezi the late Joe Slovo & Chris Hani.
 Conducted voter education with Matla Trust under Billy Modise.
 Participated in the first Presidential debate 1994 of Dr Klerk/ Mandela with 800 million global audiences.
 Hosted co-productions with the US National Public Radio & the BBC.
 Besides South African leaders, interviewed French President Jacques Chirac, German Chancellor Angela Merkel, Namibian President Nujoma, Norwegian Prime Minister Gro Grutlantd & Irish Prime Minister Mary Robertson.
 Interviewed a diverse range of personalities including Mirriam Makeba, Letta Mbulu, Brenda Fassie, Yvonne Chaka Chaka, Caiphus Semenya, Hugh Masekela, Sipho Mabuse, Abdullah Ebrahim, Angela Bassett, Danny Glover, Al Jarreau, Lionel Richie, Archbishop Desmond Tutu, Dalai Lama, John Kani, Ray Phiri, Louis Farrakhan, Jesse Jackson, Noam Chomsky, Arundathi Roy, John Pilger, Robert Fisk, et al.
 Founding Chairman of the Proudly SA Campaign.
 Communications Chief 2007-2008 of the 2010 World Cup.
 CEO of IT Company Sizwe Africa for 4 years.
 Covered all national elections since 1994 on both TV & Radio
 Participated in hosting the Dalai Lama in SA.
 Helped launch Power FM.
 Previously Board member of Open Society Foundation, Love Life Campaign, Garankuwa Forum for Excellence and now Dr Motsuenyane Foundation, Sefako Makgatho University, Dr George Mukhari Hospital.

Awards and achievements in Broadcast Media:

 SABC Broadcaster of the Year 1991.
 Inaugural Reconciliation Award from Institute of Justice & Reconciliation conferred by Archbishop Desmond Tutu.
 Communicator of the Year- Tshwane University of Technology.
 Rotary Club Paul Harris Award for Community Service.
 Agisanang Primary School renamed Tim Modise.
 GQ Magazine TV Personality of the Year.
 Jaime Brunet International Human Rights- University of Navarro, Pamplona Spain.
 Radio Hall of Fame 2011.

References

1961 births
Living people
People from Pretoria
South African Tswana people
South African television journalists
South African radio presenters